Recorded by Arizal is an American 2D animated web series, a four-part prelude to upcoming story, created by Rooster Teeth director Yssa Badiola. The first episode was released on July 13, 2020. The series first premiered on the website of Rooster Teeth for RoosterTeeth FIRST members, moving to other platforms and becoming free-to-watch a week after. In an interview with The Austin Chronicle, Badiola said that if the prelude is well-received, she "hopes to go even further out into the world" with the show in episodes to come, with the idea that the prelude episodes will introduce people to the world and characters, taking into account "viewer feedback" and use that to hone and craft a longer-form series. In one of her vlogs accompanying the show, she stated that the show is for young adults coming of age and incorporates her own life experience.

Premise
The series follows the story of Arizal, a 16-year-old Pinoy girl and straight A student who is about to pursue her desired career, to become a Record Keeper. The question remains if she can leave Maktaba, a cloistered city-state, and create records in the wide world. Through a set of vlogs, she ponders whether she can undertake this task, as part of this entry of self-discovery, and head into the world, explaining life beyond the city's limits to those living within the city. Arizal serves as the protagonist and the "audience's lens into this world".

Production and promotion
Director Yssa Badiola first envisioned the show in 2017. She hoped that the prelude helped audiences embrace and story. Arizal's name is derived from Filipino nationalist José Rizal. Badiola's own Filipino heritage shaped the show. She noted that Josh Kazemi and Jordan Cwierz were helpful in development of the show. Badiola pitched the show to Rooster Teeth executives and developed a full animatic of the show so she could convince them to support the show. Badiola's idea coincided with Joshua Kazemi pitching a live-action series about "a female vlogger in a remote setting" in January 2018, and Rooster Teeth encouraged him to come together with Badiola, with both beginning to work together on the show after that. Others who worked on the show include: Tess Richards, who worked on color, light, and detail of the backgrounds; Lauren Crozier, who designed the background; Al McClelland, Jr., who worked on the storyboards; supervising producer Maggie Tominey; producer Minni Clark; sound designer Alena Lecorchick; and re-recording mixer Philip Spann.

In July 2020, Badiola confirmed that Recorded by Arizal was a four-part prelude to a longer show, as suggested by fellow Rooster Teeth writer and director Joe Nicolosi. Badiola felt that the prelude is a "great way" to do world-building. She was influenced by shows like Fleabag, The Lizzie Bennet Diaries and other series by Pemberley Digital, along with animated vlogger Any Malu. She also stated the series had a lot of herself integrated into the story and "some observations and things I felt growing up," but is not a fictionalized version of herself. Kazemi said it was fun to dream up the world and described it as the first animation project he had worked on, while also noting he had fun writing for the show. Lead animator Tanya Fetzer was pleased to do more smooth instead of snappy animation.

Badiola said that the prelude is mainly a coming of age story, but the main driving theme is "the discussion of record keeping and learning," hoping that she can get the chance in the future to show that. The lowercase Roman numerals in the episode titles intended to demonstrate that it is an introduction to the show. Badiola stated that she sometimes felt that the show is for her, and incorporates the struggles of being an Asian-American, with the idea you have "one foot in your home country and the other the country you only ever knew about" as a peron's body straddles the line of "torn, inadequate, and desiring to engage, all at once." She noted that she suffered several panic attacks during the show's production, and expressed her concerns about the show's future. Kazemi wrote that the show became "more relatable" during the COVID-19 pandemic because more people are living in a world where "streaming from home, talking into webcams, and staying in their rooms".

The show was originally promoted in a six-second clip by Rooster Teeth on January 15, 2020, under the name "Record Keeper". The name was later changed as it was owned by another company. Rooster Teeth shared the first promo for the show on June 23. The same day, Badiola shared character designs of Arizal created for the show, and confirmed that Arizal is a Filipina. Rooster Teeth shared the second promo for the show on June 29. Christine Marie Cabanos, who voices Arizal, noted her enjoyment of portraying a Filipina lead character. Badiola hosted a Comic-Con@Home panel for the show in July.

On September 21, Badiola hosted a RTX panel with Christine Marie Cabanos, Joshua Kazemi, and Kdin Jenzen, the latter who was moderating. The panel will be a "classic Q&A" which will focus on "any lingering thoughts about the creative process behind the prelude." In the panel, new merchandise related to the show was revealed, as was concept art, part of the original pitch of the show, with the word set thousands of years in the future on Earth. Badiola talked about the design of Arizal's room, how Arizal has a lot of physical items, and that she took inspiration from Atsuko "Akko" Kagar, the protagonist of Little Witch Academia, Izuku Midoriya / Deku, the protagonist of My Hero Academia in the design of Arizal, with her outfit based on school uniforms in the Philippines. At the same time, Kazemi described how Arizal values "physical things," said it was a "blast" to write the text messages between Arizal and her friends, and how the relationship Arizal had with the camera changed over the seas. Furthermore, Cabanos noted the emotional range she used in her voice overs, stated that Arizal's voice is close to her own, making her easy to voice the character, and explained how fun it was to voice Arizal as compared to those she voiced in the past, while pointing out how much the show means to the Asians and Filipino community. In the same panel, Badiola and Cabanos expressed excitement at "plans" for Arizal to travel outside her bedroom and into the wider world as a recordkeeper. Badiola added that there would be many "elements of storytime" with narration if there was a full season, while Arizal's sexuality (and gender) would be explored, and that there were a "lot" of LGBTQ characters in a "show proper" they originally pitched.

On January 29, 2021, Badiola, when asked by a fan, said that there was "no news on a full season."

Characters 

 Arizal (voiced by Christine Marie Cabanos), the story's overachieving protagonist, a 16-year-old high school student putting together a series of vlogs about why she wants to be a record keeper, wanting to go on an adventure. Her name is pronounced "AW-rih-sawl."
 Lia (voiced by Christine Stuckart), as one of Arizal's childhood friends who convinced her to become a record keeper, and wants Arizal to experience the world rather than be holed up in her room.
 Rizella, one of Arizal's childhood friends who convinced her to become a record keeper. Something happens to her which scares Tita, as indicated in "Log iv."
 Tita Cherry (voiced by Monica Rial), who is Arizal's aunt, who she is living with during the summer. Tita runs a tight ship in the house, chastising Arizal for not cleaning her room in the show's first episode.
 Dante (voiced by César Altagracia), an experienced record keeper, introduced in the second episode.

Episodes

Prelude

Reception
Tommy Williams of GeekTyrant praised the series, calling it interesting but shorter than expected, noting that the first episode gave a small glimpse into the character of Arizal's Tita, Cherry, and her best friend, Lia. He described the animation as "decent" and said he would be likely to watch the other episodes to see where the show goes, though worried that interest for the show would "die down in the interim" between episode releases. Burkely Hermann, of the National Security Archive, noted on the American Archivist Reviews Portal that although the show does not feature archives as physical spaces or institutions, it had archival themes that could be expanded in a future "proper season." His review also noted how recordkeepers in the show have similar roles as those of real-world archivists, expressed hope that Arizal's quests will make the "annals of history richer for all the people of Maktaba," and stated that, in the future, Arizal may be responsible for records of enduring value. This would mean, in his assessment, that Arizal would be in good company with fellow learned scholars at the athenaeum.

References

External links

2020s American animated television series
Rooster Teeth
American animated web series
Philippines in fiction